Magnolia minor is a species of plant in the family Magnoliaceae. It is endemic to Cuba.  It is threatened by habitat loss.

References

minor
Endemic flora of Cuba
Endangered plants
Taxonomy articles created by Polbot